Naoki Inoue; born June 14, 1997 in Toyohashi, Aichi, Japan is a Japanese mixed martial artist competing in the bantamweight division. A professional mixed martial artist since 2014, Inoue has also competed in the Ultimate Fighting Championship.

Background
When Inoue was seven, his parents told him to do some extracurricular activity. He wanted to be strong, therefore he picked martial arts. Inoue received a first-degree black belt in karate and a blue belt in BJJ. He won the J-Network's All-Japan amateur championship as well as won the DEEP Future King (rookie) tournament in 2011.

Mixed martial arts career

Early career
Inoue made his amateur mixed martial arts debut on February 9, 2014 when he faced Gaku Sakamoto at Deep - Nagoya Impact 2014. He won via first-round submission using an armbar. Following this, Inoue compiled a professional record of 10–0, with wins over Yuya Shibata and Tomohiro Adaniya, before signing with the UFC in the winter of 2017.

Ultimate Fighting Championship
Inoue made his promotional debut on June 17, 2017 at UFC Fight Night: Holm vs. Correia against Carls John de Tomas. At the weigh-ins Carls John de Tomas came in at 131 lbs, five pounds over the flyweight limit of 126 lbs. As a result, he was fined 30% of the purse, which went to Inoue, and their bout proceeded as scheduled at a catchweight. Inoue won the fight by unanimous decision.

Inoue was expected to face Jenel Lausa on September 23, 2017 at UFC Fight Night 117, but was pulled from the card due to a dislocated shoulder.

Inoue faced Matt Schnell on June 23, 2018 at UFC Fight Night 132. He lost the fight via split decision.

Cage Fury FC
After departing from the UFC, Inoue faced Sean Santella in a flyweight bout at CFFC 72 on February 16, 2019. He lost the fight via unanimous decision.

Return to DEEP
Inoue eventually returned to DEEP, facing Toshiaki Kitada at Deep 93 on December 15, 2020. He won the fight via first-round submission.

Rizin FF
On January 24, 2020, news surfaced that Inoue was scheduled to face Trent Girdham at Rizin 21 – Hamamatsu on February 22, 2020. Inoue won the fight via unanimous decision.

In his sophomore bout in the promotion, Inoue faced Shooto Watanabe at Rizin 22 – Starting Over on August 9, 2020. He won the fight via first-round submission.

Inoue faced Yuki Motoya at Rizin 26 on December 31, 2020. He won the fight by rear naked choke, three minutes into the first round.

Rizin Bantamweight Grand Prix 2021 
Inoue faced Shintaro Ishiwatari in the opening round of the Bantamweight Grand Prix at Rizin 28 on June 13, 2021. He won the bout via soccer kick knockout in the first round.

Inoue was scheduled to face Yuto Hokamura in the quarterfinals on September 19, 2021 at Rizin 30. He won the fight by unanimous decision.

In the semi-finals, Inoue faced Hiromasa Ougikubo on December 31, 2021 at Rizin 33. He lost the bout via unanimous decision.

Post-GP reign
After suffering his first loss under the Rizin banner, Inoue was booked to face Kenta Takizawa at Rizin 37 on July 31, 2022. However in late July it was reported that Inoue withdrew from the bout citing a knee injury.

Inoue faced Kenta Takizawa on December 31, 2022 at Rizin 40 and won by submission via kimura in the second round.

Motoya is scheduled to face the former Bellator Bantamweight Champion Juan Archuleta at Rizin 42 on May 6, 2023.

Mixed martial arts record

|-
|Win
|align=center|18–3
|Kenta Takizawa
|Submission (kimura)
|Rizin 40
|
|align=center|2
|align=center|3:53
|Saitama, Japan
|
|-
|Loss
|align=center|17–3
|Hiromasa Ougikubo
|Decision (unanimous)
|Rizin 33
|
|align=center|3
|align=center|5:00
|Saitama, Japan
|
|-
|Win
|align=center|17–2
|Yuto Hokamura
|Decision (unanimous)
|Rizin 30
|
|align=center|3
|align=center|5:00
|Saitama, Japan
|
|-
|Win
|align=center|16–2
|Shintaro Ishiwatari
|KO (soccer kick)
|Rizin 28
|
|align=center|1
|align=center|2:01
|Tokyo, Japan
|
|-
|Win
|align=center|15–2
|Yuki Motoya
|Submission (rear-naked choke)
|Rizin 26
|
|align=center|1
|align=center|3:00
|Saitama, Japan
|
|-
|Win
|align=center|14–2
|Shooto Watanabe
|Submission (rear-naked choke)
|Rizin 22
|
|align=center|1
|align=center|1:40
|Yokohama, Japan
|
|-
|Win
|align=center|13–2
|Trent Girdham
|Decision (unanimous)
|Rizin 21
|
|align=center|3
|align=center|5:00
|Hamamatsu, Japan
|
|-
|Win
|align=center|12–2
|Toshiaki Kitada
|Submission (rear-naked choke)
|Deep 93: Impact
|
|align=center|1
|align=center|2:41
|Tokyo, Japan
|
|-
|Loss
|align=center|11–2
|Sean Santella
|Decision (unanimous)
|CFFC 72: Brady vs. Abdul-Hakim
|
|align=center|3
|align=center|5:00
|Atlantic City, New Jersey, United States
|
|-
|Loss
|align=center|11–1
|Matt Schnell
|Decision (split)
|UFC Fight Night: Cowboy vs. Edwards
|
|align=center|3
|align=center|5:00
|Kallang, Singapore
|
|-
| Win
|align=center| 11–0
| Carls John de Tomas
| Decision (unanimous)
|UFC Fight Night: Holm vs. Correia
| 
|align=center| 3
|align=center| 5:00
||Kallang, Singapore
| 
|-
| Win
|align=center| 10–0
| Tomohiro Adaniya
| Decision (majority)
| Deep 78: Impact
| 
|align=center| 2
|align=center| 5:00
|Tokyo, Japan
|
|-
| Win
|align=center| 9–0
| Yuya Shibata
| Submission (armbar)
| Deep: Cage Impact 2016 in Osaka
| 
|align=center| 2
|align=center| 2:51
|Tokyo, Japan
| 
|-
| Win
|align=center| 8–0
| Go Minamide
| Decision (majority)
| Deep: 77 Impact/Jewels 13
| 
|align=center| 2
|align=center| 5:00
|Tokyo, Japan
| 
|-
| Win
|align=center| 7–0
| Naoyuki Kato
| Submission (rear-naked choke)
| Deep - Nagoya Impact: Kobudo Fight
| 
|align=center| 1
|align=center| 0:44
|Tokyo, Japan
| 
|-
| Win
|align=center| 6–0
| Iyori Akiba
| Submission (rear-naked choke)
| Deep: Cage Impact 2016
| 
|align=center| 1
|align=center| 4:32
|Tokyo, Japan
| 
|-
| Win
|align=center| 5–0
| Chikara Shimabukuro
| Decision (unanimous)
| Deep 74: Impact
| 
|align=center| 2
|align=center| 5:00
|Tokyo, Japan
| 
|-
| Win
|align=center| 4–0
| Kenji Yamanaka
| Submission (rear-naked choke)
| Deep 72: Impact
| 
|align=center| 1
|align=center| 2:21
|Tokyo, Japan
| 
|-
| Win
|align=center| 3–0
| Kanta Sato
| Submission (armbar)
| Deep: Nagoya Impact: Kobudo Fight
| 
|align=center| 1
|align=center| 2:49
|Tokyo, Japan
| 
|-
| Win
|align=center| 2–0
| Icho Tomonaga
| Submission (armbar)
| Deep: Future King Tournament 2014
| 
|align=center| 1
|align=center| 0:49
|Tokyo, Japan
| 
|-
| Win
|align=center| 1–0
| Takuya Maruoka
| Submission (armbar)
| Deep: Future King Tournament 2014
| 
|align=center| 1
|align=center| 3:21
|Tokyo, Japan
|

Amateur mixed martial arts record

|-
| Win
|align=center| 2-0
| Kenichi Kimura
| Decision (Unanimous)
|Deep - Amateur Deep 20: Kobudo Fight
| 
|align=center| 3
|align=center| 5:00
|Tokyo, Japan
| 
|-
| Win
|align=center| 1-0
| Gaku Sakamoto
| Submission (armbar)
| Deep - Nagoya Impact 2014
| 
|align=center| 1
|align=center| 3:04
|Tokyo, Japan
|
|-
|}

Amateur Kickboxing record

|-  style="background:#cfc;"
| 2016-11-20|| Win||align=left| Ryota Shibasaki || J-Network All Japan A-League Tournament,  Final|| Tokyo, Japan || KO || 1  || 0:46
|-
! style=background:white colspan=9 |
|-  style="background:#cfc;"
| 2016-11-20|| Win||align=left| Kaisei Kondo || J-Network All Japan A-League Tournament, Semi Final|| Tokyo, Japan || Decision (Unanimous)||   ||
|-  style="background:#CCFFCC;"
| 2016-11-20|| Win ||align=left| Hiroki Sato || J-Network All Japan A-League Tournament, Quarter Final|| Tokyo, Japan || Decision (Unanimous)||   || 
|-
| colspan=9 | Legend:

See also
 List of current Rizin FF fighters
 List of male mixed martial artists

References

External links
 
 

1997 births
People from Toyohashi
Japanese male karateka
Japanese male mixed martial artists
Flyweight mixed martial artists
Mixed martial artists utilizing karate
Mixed martial artists utilizing Brazilian jiu-jitsu
Japanese practitioners of Brazilian jiu-jitsu
Living people
Ultimate Fighting Championship male fighters